Fangs of the Wild is a 1939 American drama film directed by Raymond K. Johnson and starring Dennis Moore, Luana Walters and Tom London.

Cast
Dennis Moore as Don Brady
Luana Walters as Carol Dean
Tom London as Larry Dean
Ted Adams as Fur salesman Lewis
Mae Busch as Fur buyer
George Chesebro as Fur thief Brad
Jimmy Aubrey as Fur thief Pete
Bud Osborne as Clem
George Morrell as Captain Dwyer
Martin Spellman as Buddy Brady
Rin Tin Tin, Jr. as Rinty, Don's dog

References

Bibliography
 Pitts, Michael R. Poverty Row Studios, 1929-1940. McFarland & Company, 2005.

External links

1939 films
1939 drama films
American black-and-white films
American drama films
Films about dogs
Films directed by Raymond K. Johnson
Rin Tin Tin
Astor Pictures films
1930s English-language films
1930s American films